Chuma Edoga (born May 25, 1997) is an American football offensive tackle for the Atlanta Falcons of the National Football League (NFL). He played college football at USC and was drafted by the New York Jets in the third round of the 2019 NFL Draft.

Professional career

Edoga was drafted by the New York Jets in the third round (92nd overall) of the 2019 NFL Draft. He started eight games at both tackle spots before suffering a knee injury in Week 12. He was placed on injured reserve on December 17, 2019.

Edoga entered the 2021 season as a backup offensive tackle. He was placed on injured reserve on November 13, 2021. He was activated on December 18.

On August 30, 2022, Edoga was waived by the Jets.

Atlanta Falcons
On August 31, 2022, Edoga was claimed off waivers by the Atlanta Falcons.

Personal life
He is of Nigerian descent.

References

External links
USC Trojans bio

1997 births
Living people
American sportspeople of Nigerian descent
People from Powder Springs, Georgia
Sportspeople from Cobb County, Georgia
Players of American football from Georgia (U.S. state)
American football offensive linemen
USC Trojans football players
New York Jets players
Atlanta Falcons players